"The Study of Administration" is an 1887 article by Woodrow Wilson in Political Science Quarterly.  It is widely considered a foundational article in the field of public administration, making Wilson one of the field's founding fathers, along with Max Weber and Frederick Winslow Taylor.

Although colleges were already teaching public administration in the 1880s, it was considered a sub-field of political science. Wilson argued that it should be treated as its own field of study, with public administrators being directly responsible to political leaders. He believed that politicians should be accountable to the people and that political administration should be treated as a science, and its practitioners given authority to address issues in their respective fields.

References

1887 documents
Works by Woodrow Wilson
Public administration